Alishah (also Romanized as ʿAlīshāh) is a village in Faruj Rural District, in the Central District of Faruj County, North Khorasan Province, Iran. At the 2006 census, its population was 37, in 10 families.

References 

Populated places in Faruj County